The 2018 Everest Premier League, also known as EPL3 or 2018 TVS EPL because of the sponsorship reason, was the third edition of the Everest Premier League, a professional men's domestic Twenty20 cricket competition in Nepal. The tournament was held from 8 December 2018 to 22 December 2018. Biratnagar Warriors were defending champions for the tournament but they were eliminated in the group stage. Lalitpur Patriots won the 2018 season and it's their first title.

Players Release and Bidding
The players release and bidding process was held on 11 November 2018 and broadcast live on the official Facebook page of EPL in the presence of Raman Shiwakoti, chief of EPL technical committee and the manager of Nepal men's national cricket team. In the player release and bidding process, each team could release maximum of three players and they could bid for the released players as well as the unsold players and the players who did not register for 2017 EPL auction. Hari Chauhan was the most bidded player (NPR 85,000) in the process by Biratnagar Warriors. Tigers acquired Sagar Dhakal and Adil Khan. Kings XI brought in Samsaad Sheikh while Rhinos secured Shubhendu Pandey and Nandan Yadav. Gladiators did not bid and Patriots did not release any players.

Venues

Teams and Squads
The marquee players from the 2017 Everest Premier League were retained by their respective teams as a part of a three year agreement. The franchise teams are obliged to select at least three foreign players and one local player from the talent hunt program as per the Everest Premier League regulation.

Points table

League matches

Match 1

Match 2

Match 3

Match 4

Match 5

Match 6

Match 7

Match 8

Statistics

Most runs 

Source: ESPNcricinfo, 22 December 2018

Most wickets 

Source: ESPNcricinfo, 22 December 2018

References

External links 

Everest Premier League
Everest Premier League